Bandhi (Sindhi: ٻانڌي ) is a town  of Shaheed Benazir Abad District of Sindh, with a population of over 40,000.

History

Bandhi is not a historically rich town, however there are few big names who have done research on the history of the town.

Demographics
Most of the people living in Bandhi town are Sindhi speaking68%, others include Baloch 2%, Punjabis 3%, Pashtuns1%, a Urdu speakers25% (Muhajirs)and Brahui(Brohi) Almost 95% of the people of town are Muslims.

Education
There are various primary schools and couple of higher schools in town.

See also

Nawabshah
Shaheed Benazirabad
Daur

References

Populated places in Shaheed Benazir Abad District